Sir Oswald Arthur Scott, KCMG, DSO (17 June 1893 – 19 May 1960) was a British diplomat.

Biography 
The second son of Archibald Scott, Rotherfield Park, Alton, Hampshire, Scott was educated at Eton College and Magdalen College, Oxford. He served with the Hampshire Regiment during the First World War, was appointed DSO and mentioned in despatches. Joining the Diplomatic Service in 1919, he was British Minister to Finland from 1947 to 1951 and British Ambassador to Peru from 1951 to 1953. He retired in 1954.

Scott was appointed CMG in 1946 and KCMG in 1951.

References 

 https://www.ukwhoswho.com/view/10.1093/ww/9780199540891.001.0001/ww-9780199540884-e-242751

1893 births
1960 deaths
Ambassadors of the United Kingdom to Peru
People educated at Eton College
Alumni of Magdalen College, Oxford
Ambassadors of the United Kingdom to Finland
Place of death missing
Place of birth missing